Marianne Kiefer (3 September 1928 – 4 January 2008) was a German actress. Born in Dresden, she was the daughter of a married couple of artists. She died in Kreischa.

Filmography
 Langer Samstag (2003)
 Drei reizende Schwestern (1984–1991)
 Mensch, mein Papa...! (1988)
 Polizeiruf 100 (1987)
 Maxe Baumann aus Berlin (1987)
 Leute sind auch Menschen (1986)
 Beswingt und heiter (1983)
 Maxe Baumann (1981–1982)
 Engel im Taxi, Ein (1981)
 Ich bin nicht meine Tante (1980)
 Altes Modell, Ein (1976)
 Heiraten/Weiblich (1975)
 Toggenburger Bock (1975)
 Neues aus der Florentiner 73 (1974)
 Bermsers machen Urlaub (1973)
 Florentiner 73 (1972)

References

External links
 

1928 births
2008 deaths
German television actresses
Deaths from diabetes
Actors from Dresden